In computing,  is a command to search the man page files in Unix and Unix-like operating systems. Apropos takes its name from the French "à propos" (Latin "ad prōpositum") which means about. It is particularly useful when searching for commands without knowing their exact names.

Behavior 
Often a wrapper for the  command, the apropos command is used to search the "name" sections of all manual pages for the string/s (called keyword/s) specified. The output is a list of all manual pages containing the search term in their name or description. This is often useful if one knows the action that is desired, but does not remember the exact command or page name. apropos search is case insensitive.

Sample usage 
The following example demonstrates the output of the  command:
$ apropos mount
free (1)             - Display amount of free and used memory in the system
mklost+found (8)     - create a lost+found directory on a mounted Linux second extended file system
mount (8)            - mount a file system
mountpoint (1)       - see if a directory is a mountpoint
ntfsmount (8)        - Read/Write userspace NTFS driver.
sleep (1)            - delay for a specified amount of time
switch_root (8)      - switch to another filesystem as the root of the mount tree.
umount (8)           - unmount file systems

In this example,  is used to search for the keyword "mount", and  returns the indicated man pages that include the term "mount".

The following example demonstrates the output of the  command with an regexp keyword (abc.n) and a regular keyword:

$ apropos abc.n xzless
XTestGrabControl (3) - XTest extension functions
xzless (1)           - view xz or lzma compressed (text) files

In this example,  is used to search for the keywords (with an regexp .) "abc.n" and xzless, and  returns the indicated man pages that include the keywords.

Related utilities
 is a command for obtaining the brief description of a specific command whose exact name is already known. It uses the same database as  does.

$ whatis whatis
whatis(1)                - search the whatis database for complete words

 is a command for indexing all on-disk manuals into a database that  and  can read from.

The database is traditionally plain text, but man-db, the implementation found on many Linux distributions, use a Berkeley DB instead. The mandoc implementation used on many BSD distributions likewise has its own innovations on the format.

See also 
 Man page
 whatis

References

External links 
 
 
 
  at the LinuxQuestions.org wiki

Unix text processing utilities